Lijana Gedminaitė (born 25 December 1998) is a Lithuanian footballer who plays as a forward for Banga and the Lithuania women's national team.

References

1998 births
Living people
Lithuanian women's footballers
Women's association football forwards
Lithuania women's international footballers